Chenaqrud (also Romanized as Chenāqrūd; also known as Chenāqerd, Ḩanāqerd, Janāqrūd, Jenagherd, Jenāqerd, and Jinakart) is a village in Sardabeh Rural District, in the Central District of Ardabil County, Ardabil Province, Iran. At the 2006 census, its population was 2,480, in 569 families.

References 

Tageo

Towns and villages in Ardabil County